Sanxi is a town in Jingde County, Anhui, China.  it had a population of 13,083 and an area of . It borders Caijiaqiao Town in the East, Suncun Town in the south, Xinglong Town in the West and Langqiao Town of Jing County in the north.

Etymology
Sanxi means three streams. It is named Sanxi because Hui Stream, Linxi Stream, and Yu Stream meet and flow into the Jing River in the town.

Administrative division
It includes thirteen villages and one community: 
 Sanxikou Community  
 Gaoxi  
 Shangyu
 Baishu
 Guantang
 Junlin
 Jiangfu
 Gaoqiao
 Zanghe
 Yaji 
 Hengshan
 Lizhong
 Baxiang
 Zhulin
 Huangchong

Geography
Hui Stream(), Yu Stream and Linxi Stream flow through the town.

Economy
The local food crops are rice, rape, peanuts, and beans.

The town is rich in lead, zinc, quartz, amethyst, and sandstone.

Transportation
National Highway G205 passes across the town.

Attractions
Lecheng Bridge is a famous scenic spot in Anhui province. It was originally built in 1543 during the Jiajing period of the Ming dynasty (1638–1644) and rebuilt in the reign of Kangxi Emperor of the Qing dynasty (1644–1911). The bridge was destroyed by floods on July 6, 2020.

References

Divisions of Jingde County
Towns in Anhui